Achryson lineolatum is a species of longhorn beetle in the Cerambycinae subfamily. It was described by Wilhelm Ferdinand Erichson in 1847. It is known from Ecuador, Peru, Bolivia, Chile, and the Galápagos Islands.

References

Achrysonini
Beetles described in 1847
Taxa named by Wilhelm Ferdinand Erichson